Nosodendron is a genus of wounded-tree beetles in the family Nosodendridae. There are more than 70 described species in Nosodendron.

Species
These 73 species belong to the genus Nosodendron:

 Nosodendron africanum Endrödy-Younga, 1989
 Nosodendron agaboides Champion, 1923
 Nosodendron angelum Reichardt, 1973
 Nosodendron asiaticum Lewis, 1889
 Nosodendron australe Fauvel, 1903
 Nosodendron australicum Lea, 1931
 Nosodendron batchianum Champion, 1923
 Nosodendron bilyi Háva, 2000
 Nosodendron boliviense Háva, 2005
 Nosodendron bucki Jorge, 1973
 Nosodendron californicum Horn, 1874
 Nosodendron calvum (Tryon, 1892)
 Nosodendron carolinense Yoshitomi, 2013
 Nosodendron celebense Champion, 1923
 Nosodendron ceylanicum Motschulsky, 1863
 Nosodendron chelonarium Joly, 1991
 Nosodendron coenosum (Wollaston, 1873)
 Nosodendron derasum Sharp, 1902
 Nosodendron disjectum Champion, 1923
 Nosodendron dybasi Reichardt, 1976
 Nosodendron elongatum Endrödy-Younga, 1991
 Nosodendron fasciatum Joly, 1991
 Nosodendron fasciculare (Olivier, 1790)
 Nosodendron fijiense Lea, 1931
 Nosodendron glabratum Champion, 1923
 Nosodendron grande (Reitter, 1881)
 Nosodendron hageni (Reitter, 1886)
 Nosodendron helferi Háva, 2000
 Nosodendron hispidum Champion, 1923
 Nosodendron horaki Háva, 2000
 Nosodendron incognitum Háva, 2005
 Nosodendron indicum Pic, 1923
 Nosodendron interruptum Lea, 1931
 Nosodendron jakli Háva, 2005
 Nosodendron jirii Hava, 2011
 Nosodendron kalimantanus Háva, 2005
 Nosodendron latifrons Sharp, 1902
 Nosodendron latum Endrödy-Younga, 1991
 Nosodendron leechi Reichardt, 1976
 Nosodendron lentum Oehme-Leonhardt, 1954
 Nosodendron loebli Háva, 2003
 Nosodendron madagascariense Alluaud, 1896
 Nosodendron marginatum (Reitter, 1886)
 Nosodendron mediobasale Lea, 1931
 Nosodendron mexicanum Sharp, 1902
 Nosodendron nepalense Háva & Farkac, 2003
 Nosodendron niasense Háva, 2005
 Nosodendron nitidum Champion, 1923
 Nosodendron nomurai Háva, 2000
 Nosodendron oblongum Champion, 1923
 Nosodendron ogasawaraense Yoshitomi, Kishimoto & Lee, 2015
 Nosodendron ovatum Broun, 1880
 Nosodendron pauliani Endrödy-Younga, 1991
 Nosodendron politum Sharp, 1902
 Nosodendron prudeki Háva, 2000
 Nosodendron punctatostriatum Chevrolat, 1864
 Nosodendron punctulatum (Reitter, 1886)
 Nosodendron reichardti Joly, 1991
 Nosodendron ritsemae (Reitter, 1886)
 Nosodendron sikkimense Champion, 1923
 Nosodendron slipinskii Endrödy-Younga, 1991
 Nosodendron smetanai Háva, 2003
 Nosodendron strigiferum Champion, 1923
 Nosodendron subtile Sharp, 1902
 Nosodendron taiwanense Yoshitomi, Kishimoto & Lee, 2015
 Nosodendron testudinum Waterhouse, 1876
 Nosodendron thompsoni Reichardt, 1976
 Nosodendron tiomanense Háva, 2006
 Nosodendron tonkineum Pic, 1923
 Nosodendron tritavum Scudder, 1890
 Nosodendron unicolor Say, 1824 (slime flux beetle)
 Nosodendron vestitum (Tryon, 1892)
 Nosodendron zealandicum Sharp, 1882

References

Further reading

External links

 

Polyphaga
Articles created by Qbugbot